Moses Hamungole (1 May 1967 – 13 January 2021) was a Zambian prelate of the Catholic Church who was bishop of Monze from 2014 to 2021.

Life
Hamungole was born in Zambia and ordained to the priesthood on 6 August 1994. 

He was head of the English Africa section of the Rome-based Vatican Radio from 2010 to 2014.

Pope Francis appointed him bishop of Monze on 10 February 2014 and he received his episcopal consecration on 3 May from his predecessor Bishop Emilio Patriarca.

He died of COVID-19 during the COVID-19 pandemic in Zambia in 2021.

Notes

1967 births
2021 deaths
Deaths from the COVID-19 pandemic in Zambia
21st-century Roman Catholic bishops in Zambia
Roman Catholic bishops of Monze
Zambian Roman Catholic bishops